The 2012–13 Atlantic 10 Conference men's basketball season marks the 37th season of Atlantic 10 Conference basketball. The season marks the first for new members Butler and VCU, and the last for departing members Temple and Charlotte.  The 2013 Atlantic 10 men's basketball tournament will be held for the first time at Barclays Center in Brooklyn, New York.

Preseason
Prior to the season, the Atlantic 10 welcomed new members, Butler and VCU.  The two schools joined the conference immediately, rather than waiting a season as Butler initially intended, because they "weren't going to be allowed to play in the respective conference tournaments." With the addition of these programs, the conference sits at 16 teams for one year, yet the conference slate stayed at 16 games.  "The league had to be creative with its schedule knowing that it would be for only one season.  Every team will play each team once with one rivalry game twice."

The conference moved the conference tournament to the Barclays Center in Brooklyn, New York, after six seasons in Atlantic City.  Analysts predict "the league's Big Apple debut might result in a record number of bids for this stacked conference." The contract lasts for five years.  "I just think it's going to be a rebirth of college basketball in New York," said Fordham coach Tom Pecora, who was born in the borough.

For the 2012–13 season, Butler lost Ronald Nored to graduation and Chrishawn Hopkins to a violation of team rules, but returned nearly every other significant player and added key players in transfer Rotnei Clarke and freshman Kellen Dunham.

Charlotte's Chris Braswell "might be the best big man in the league, and the 49ers have a good recruiting class entering the fold." Dayton's frontcourt garnered press for its depth, with Kevin Dillard returning as point guard, along with transfers Vee Sanford and Matt Derenbecker.

"Va. Tech transfer Tyrone Garland joins a loaded perimeter group" at La Salle, and Massachusetts "could be a title threat" with point guard Chaz Williams, who returned along with three other starters following a run to the NIT semifinals.

2012 A10 tournament champion Saint Bonaventure faced potential struggle after the loss of Andrew Nicholson, who "was a dominant force throughout his career." However, the Bonnies returned Marquise Simmons and Michael Davenport from injuries.  Saint Joseph's returned everyone "from a team that was in the mix for an NCAA bid until late."

Saint Louis was the favorite among many analysts because, although it lost Brian Conklin, the team returned Kwamain Mitchell and "locks down on D." The Billikens are without coach Rick Majerus, who "is taking a leave of absence for health reasons."  Majerus died on December 1, 2012, prompting Commissioner Bernadette McGlade's statement, "The entire Atlantic 10 family is grieving tonight over the loss of coach Majerus. His undeniable knowledge and love of the game was known to all, and he was an excellent teacher committed to the student-athlete. This passion made his impact on A-10 basketball over the past five years immeasurable. He will be missed at Saint Louis , within the A-10 and nationally; our prayers and condolences are with coach Majerus’
family and the Saint Louis University community."

Perpetual favorites Temple and Xavier both lost "key weapons" but neither were expected to have a "huge drop" as Temple's "Scootie Randall will be healthy [and] Khalif Wyatt is back" and Xavier adds Semaj Christon and Isaiah Philmore.  However, Xavier lost all of its starters and half of its "highly regarded recruiting class (Myles Davis and Jalen Reynolds) to academic issues."

CBS analyst Jeff Borzello noted that "It will be interesting to see how VCU adjusts in its first year. With that said, the Rams return many of their weapons from last season." However, the rams do not have freshmen recruits Mo Alie-Cox and Jordan Burgess, who "is considered a top 100 recruit,"  as the school announced they were only partial qualifiers by the NCAA and thus were not be eligible to compete until at least the 2013–14 season.

Atlantic 10 preseason poll

Source

Atlantic 10 preseason teams

Source

Conference Previews
Several media outlets projected the final Atlantic 10 Conference standings for the 2012–13 season:

Preseason watchlists

Regular season

Rankings

A-10 vs. other conferences

As of 12/3/2012

Weekly honors
Throughout the conference regular season, the Atlantic 10 offices name a player of the week and rookie of the week each Monday.

Butler's Roosevelt Jones was named the Oscar Robertson National Player of the Week on January 21, 2013.

Postseason

Atlantic 10 All-Conference teams

References